The Dry River is a  river in the White Mountains of New Hampshire in the United States. It is a tributary of the Saco River, which flows to the Atlantic Ocean in Maine. For nearly its entire length, it is within the Presidential Range-Dry River Wilderness of the White Mountain National Forest.

The Dry River rises in Oakes Gulf, a glacial cirque on the southern slopes of Mount Washington, the highest peak in the northeastern United States. The river flows southwest through a wooded mountain valley between the southern part of the Presidential Range to its west and the lower Montalban Ridge, including Mount Isolation, to its east. It is paralleled for its entire distance through the wilderness area by the Dry River Trail.

The river ends in Crawford Notch State Park, where it joins the Saco River.

Wilderness
Established in 1975 by the U.S. Congress, the Dry River is the centerpiece to the Presidential Range-Dry River Wilderness and is protected as part of the National Wilderness Preservation System. This  wilderness area is managed by the U.S. Forest Service.

See also

List of rivers of New Hampshire

References

External links
Presidential Range-Dry River Wilderness - White Mountain National Forest

Rivers of New Hampshire
Saco River
White Mountains (New Hampshire)
Rivers of Coös County, New Hampshire